Alkatvaam (Y’ḷkytvèèm) is a rural locality (a selo) in Anadyrsky District of Chukotka Autonomous Okrug, Russia. Population:  with an estimated population as of 1 January 2015 of 263. It is located on the Alkatvaam River (from the Chukchi meaning "flowing river") just west of Beringovsky. Municipally, it is incorporated as Alkatvaam Rural Settlement.

Demographics
Alkatvaam is a small settlement, with a 2010 census population of 299, of whom 158 were male and 141 female, a significant decrease on a 2003 population estimate of 381 inhabitants. It is populated mainly by indigenous Chukchi (around 90%).

Economy
The village has been provided with a number of modern amenities including a general store, a school, a hospital, a kindergarten, a cultural centre, and a utilities enterprise (effectively the remains of a Soviet-era kolkhoz). Near to the village is a new project to develop large coal deposits.

Culture
The modern facilities are paired with a traditional ensemble and regular celebration of all traditional festivals. The ensemble "Olyenyenok" (lit. Deer) come from the village. They have been established for over 40 years and have performed many times both across Chukotka and beyond.

Administrative vs. municipal jurisdiction
Until July 2008, Alkatvaam was a part of both Beringovsky Municipal and Beringovsky Administrative District. In May 2008, Beringovsky Municipal District was merged into Anadyrsky Municipal District (the administrative centre of which is Anadyr); however, this change did not affect the borders of Beringovsky Administrative District. Alkatvaam continued to belong administratively to the latter until June 2011, when Beringovsky Administrative District was merged into Anadyrsky Administrative District and ceased to exist.

Climate
Alkatvaam has a polar climate (Köppen climate classification ET) with bitterly cold, very long and snowy winters and cool, short summers.

See also
List of inhabited localities in Anadyrsky District

References

Notes

Sources

External links
Alkatvaam photo gallery
More photos of Alkatvaam

Rural localities in Chukotka Autonomous Okrug